The Real Estate (Regulation and Development) Act, 2016 is an Act of the Parliament of India which seeks to protect home-buyers as well as help boost investments in the real estate industry. The Act establishes a Real Estate Regulatory Authority (RERA) in each state for regulation of the real estate sector and also acts as an adjudicating body for speedy dispute resolution. The bill was passed by the Rajya Sabha on 10 March 2016 and by the Lok Sabha on 15 March 2016. The Act came into force on 1 May 2016 with 61 of 92 sections notified. The remaining provisions came into force on 1 May 2017. The Central and state governments are liable to notify the Rules under the Act within a statutory period of six months.

History
The Real Estate Regulatory Authority (RERA) Bill was introduced in 2013. In December 2015, the Union Cabinet of India had approved 20 major amendments to the bill based on the recommendations of a Rajya Sabha committee that examined the bill. The Bill had been referred to a selection committee, which had given its report in July 2015. However, Congress, Left and AIADMK had expressed their reservations on the report through dissent notes. The Rajya Sabha approved the bill on 10 March 2016 and the Lok Sabha approved it on 15 March 2016.

Subsequently, by the powers vested by Section 1 of the Rera Act, the Ministry of Housing and Urban Poverty Alleviation vide Notification S.O. 1544(E) dated 26.04.2016 notified 61 Sections out of 92 Sections on 1 May 2016 and vide Notification S.O. 1216(E) dated 19.04.2017 notified the remaining 31 Sections.

Structure 
The Rera Act 2016 has been divided into 10 Chapters, which is further categorised into 92 Sections.

The Act starts with the Preamble, provides title, extent and commencement, registration of real estate projects and real estate agents, functions and duties of promoter, rights and duties of allottees, about Real Estate Regulatory Authority, Central Advisory Council, Real Estate Appellate Tribunal, various offences, penalties, and adjudication, about finances, accounts, audits, and reports and other miscellaneous provisions.

Below is the outline of the Rera Act 2016 in tabular form-

Principal Provisions

Definition Clause 
The definition clause under Section 2 of the Act enlists the meaning of multiple terms used throughout the Act. Below is a table enlisting crucial definitions-

Registration of Real Estate Project and Real Estate Agents
The Act enlists the registration policy of a real estate project and real estate agent and related provision under Section 3.

Sub-section (1) of Section 3 of the Act makes it mandatory for all real estate projects to register with RERA for launching a project to provide greater transparency in project marketing and execution. For ongoing projects which have not received a completion certificate on the date of commencement of the Act, will have to seek registrations within 3 months.

Each State RERA must either approve or reject the application for registration within 30 days from the date of application submitted by the promoter. Upon successful registration, the promoter of the real estate project will be provided with a registration number, a login ID, and a password to fill up the essential details on the website of the State RERA.

If the promoter fails to register, he shall be liable to a penalty that may extend up to a penalty of 10% of the estimated project cost. Furthermore, if he does not comply with the orders, directions or decisions issued by the State Rera, he shall be punishable with imprisonment which may extend up to three years or with a fine which may extend up to a further 10% of the estimated cost of the project.

Real estate agents who facilitate the selling or purchase of properties must take prior registration. Such agents will be issued a single registration number for each State or Union Territory, which must be quoted by the agent in every sale facilitated by him. If a real estate agent fails to register or contravenes section 9 (registration of real estate agent) and section 10 (Functions and duties of a real estate agent), he shall be liable to a penalty of ₹10,000 payable every day during which such default continues. This penalty may cumulatively extend up to 5% of the cost of the plot, apartment or building, as the case may be, of the real estate project.

Establishment of Real Estate Regulatory Authority and Appellate Tribunal 
The establishment under Section 20 and 43 of the Act will help to establish state-level Real Estate Regulatory Authorities to regulate transactions related to both residential and commercial projects and ensure their timely completion and handover. Appellate Tribunals will now be required to adjudicate cases in 60 days as against the earlier provision of 90 days and Regulatory Authorities to dispose of complaints in 60 days while no time-frame was indicated in the earlier Bill.

Offences, Penalties and Adjudication 
Sections 59 to 72 of Chapter VIII of the Act provides the provisions regarding Offences, Penalties, and Adjudication.

Punishment for Non-Registration 
Section 59, 60 and 62 of the Act provides the punishment to the promoters and the real estate agents for non-registration under Rera.

Below is a table describing the penalty and imprisonment-

Punishment for non-compliance of orders, decisions or directions

Protection of Homebuyers
The Act prohibits unaccounted money from being pumped into the sector, and as of now 70% of the money has to be deposited in bank accounts through cheques compulsorily. A major benefit for consumers included in the Act is that builders will have to quote prices based on carpet area and not on super built-up area. The Act states that the carpet area include usable spaces like kitchen and toilets. Under Rera, its mandatory for the builders to disclose the carpet area.

State Regulations under Rera
Section 84 of the Act provides that within six months of the Act being enforced, each State Government shall make rules for carrying out the provisions of the Act. The said Rules are to be notified by the State Government. As late as 31 October 2016, Central Government, released the Real Estate (Regulation and Development) (General) Rules, 2016, vide Notification by the Ministry of Housing & Urban Poverty Alleviation (HUPA). The Rules so issued by the Central Government are applicable to the five Union Territories without Legislature viz., Andaman & Nicobar Islands, Dadra & Nagar Haveli, Daman & Diu, Lakshadweep, and Chandigarh. The Rules have been issued after the prior release of Draft for comments.

As of 13 July 2019, Arunachal Pradesh, Meghalaya, Sikkim and Nagaland have not notified the Rules. In the case of five north-eastern states, the RERA Act is facing certain constitutional challenges as the land in those states are community owned. West Bengal notified a similar law called the West Bengal Housing Industry Regulatory Act, 2017, which came into effect from 1 June 2018. However, as of July 2019, many states have not implemented the law and failed to notify a Permanent Regulator, Appellate Authority or a website. A chart showing the implementation status by different states as of July 2019 can be seen here.

References

Real estate in India
2016 in Indian economy
Acts of the Parliament of India 2016